Buckshot LeFonque was a musical group project led by Branford Marsalis. The name Buckshot La Funke was a pseudonym used by jazz saxophonist Julian "Cannonball" Adderley for contractual reasons on the album Here Comes Louis Smith (1958). After playing with Sting, Miles Davis and other artists, Marsalis founded this band to create a new sound by merging classic jazz with rock, pop, R&B and hip-hop influences.

Career
Buckshot LeFonque began primarily as a collaboration between Branford Marsalis and DJ Premier.  Marsalis moved from New York to Los Angeles in 1992 to commence work as the Musical Director on the Tonight Show, which had acquired Jay Leno as its new host. Marsalis hosted DJ Premier, as well as Engineer Ben Austin, in his Los Angeles residence, and began composition on the album. He assembled a recording band primarily from the jazz players in the Tonight Show Band, which included Jeff Watts, Robert Hurst, Kenny Kirland, Kevin Eubanks. The band recorded at Sony Studios Los Angeles summer of 1993.

Two albums were released, Buckshot LeFonque (1994) (which featured mostly DJ Premier produced tracks) and the follow-up Music Evolution (1997) (which featured mostly Frank McComb on the vocals). Other frequent collaborators were Branford Marsalis' brother, Delfeayo Marsalis, and the rapper, Uptown.

Live band members included:
 Branford Marsalis - MC as well as tenor, alto and soprano saxophone
 Frank McComb - keyboards and vocals
 50 Styles:The Unknown Soldier, Ricky Dacosta - rapper
 Joey Calderazzo - keyboards / first tour
 Kermith Campbell - keyboards / until McComb was available
 Russell Gunn - trumpet
 John Touchy - Trombone - first tour
 Carl Burnett - acoustic and electric guitar
 Reggie Washington - upright and electric bass / first half of first tour
 Reginald Veal - upright and electric bass / second half of first tour
 Eric Revis - upright and electric bass / second tour
 DJ Apollo - turntables "Wheels O Steel"
 DJ Premier - turntables, beats, drum programming, production
 Rocky Bryant - drums and percussion, beat sample triggering
 Mino Cinelu - percussion / first tour
 Black Heart the group - rappers / first tour
 Buckethead - guitar (studio)

Releases

Albums
 Buckshot LeFonque (1994)
 Music Evolution (1997)

Singles
 "Breakfast @ Denny's" (1994)
 "Some Cow Fonque" (1994)
 "No Pain, No Gain" (1995)
 "Another Day" (1997)
 "Music Evolution" (1997)

Soundtracks
 "Reality Check" from Clockers (1995)
 "Some Cow Fonque (More Tea, Vicar?)" from Men in Black (1997)
 "Breakfast @ Denny's (New Version)" from Once in the Life (2000)

References

External links
Branford Marsalis' website

 

American jazz ensembles